Conrad Barnard (born 27 July 1979, in Port Elizabeth) is a former South African rugby union player, who played as a fly-half.

Club / province / franchise career

Franchise (Super 12/14)

Barnard played 14 games in Super Rugby.

References

South African rugby union players
1979 births
Living people
Griquas (rugby union) players
Cheetahs (rugby union) players
Sharks (rugby union) players
Sharks (Currie Cup) players
Rugby union fly-halves
Sportspeople from Port Elizabeth
Rugby union players from Port Elizabeth